Tom Purrington (born 24 October 2000) is an English professional footballer who plays as a midfielder for Tiverton Town.

Career
Purrington made his professional debut on 13 November 2018 in an EFL Trophy match between Argyle and EFL League Two side Newport County, where he came on as an 81st-minute substitute, replacing Stuart O'Keefe. Newport won the game 2–0.

On 30 August 2019 Purrington, alongside fellow midfielder Cameron Sangster, joined Dorchester Town of the Southern League Premier South on loan until January 2020.

On 8th September 2020, it was announced that Purrington had signed for Bromley after impressing on trial. 

In June 2021, Purrington returned to Dorchester Town, having spent time with the club having spent time with the club on loan two years prior. In June 2022, Purrington moved to fellow Southern League Premier Division South club Tiverton Town.

Personal life
Purrington is the younger brother of Charlton Athletic defender Ben Purrington. The pair are nephews of former England rugby union player Richard Hill.

Career statistics

References

2000 births
Living people
Sportspeople from Exeter
English footballers
Association football midfielders
Plymouth Argyle F.C. players
Bromley F.C. players
Dorchester Town F.C. players
Tiverton Town F.C. players
Southern Football League players
National League (English football) players